A list of notable buildings and structures in Chad:

N'Djamena

National Assembly
Chad National Museum
Kempinski Hotel N'Djamena